Stjepan "Stipe" Milardović (born 17 November 1953), also known as Milo in Spain, is a Croatian former professional footballer who played as a forward.

References

External links
 
 

1953 births
Living people
Footballers from Split, Croatia
Association football forwards
Yugoslav footballers
SpVgg Bayreuth players
FC St. Pauli players
Linares CF players
CD Tenerife players
RNK Split players
Bundesliga players
2. Bundesliga players
Segunda División players
Yugoslav expatriate footballers
Expatriate footballers in West Germany
Yugoslav expatriate sportspeople in West Germany
Expatriate footballers in Spain
Yugoslav expatriate sportspeople in Spain